Valērijs Žolnerovičs (born April 19, 1985 in Ventspils) is a Latvian Olympic athlete. He is the current holder of the Latvian record both in marathon and half marathon.

Trained by Dainis Lodiņš, Žolnerovičs finished the 3000m steeplechase at the 2008 Summer Olympics in Beijing with a time of 8:37.65 (32nd overall). In 2010 he won the half marathon distance of Riga Marathon, finishing after 1:05:40 and beating the event record, set by Pavel Loskutov in 2008, by 12 seconds. At the 2011 Lisbon Half Marathon Žolnerovičs broke the Latvian record in half marathon, finishing after 1:04:43.

At the 2013 Frankfurt Marathon Žolnerovičs broke the Latvian record in marathon for the second time, finishing after 2:14:33.

Achievements

References

External links
ESPN profile
Valērijs Žolnerovičs at lat-athletics.lv

1985 births
Living people
Olympic athletes of Latvia
Latvian male long-distance runners
Latvian male steeplechase runners
People from Ventspils
Athletes (track and field) at the 2008 Summer Olympics
Athletes (track and field) at the 2012 Summer Olympics